Sarbeswar Mohanty may refer to:
 Sarbeswar Mohanty (cricketer)
 Sarbeswar Mohanty (civil servant)